Fire and Ice is a German feature length sports film directed by Willy Bogner in 1986.

Plot
John (John Eaves) and Suzy (Suzy Chaffee) meet while skiing in Aspen, Colorado. They run into each other again in New York and John follows her around the country.

Cast
In alphabetical order
Kelby Anno as Wind Surfer
Philippe Bernard as Hangglider
Scott Brooksbank as Skier
Jan Bucher as Skier
Suzy Chaffee as Suzy
John Denver as Narrator (voice)
John Eaves as Skier
Masayoshi Hija as Cowboy
Wolfgang Junginger as Skier
Suzy Kay as Skier
Wong Kong as Cowboy
Gianfranco L'Amore as Crazy Skier
Steve Link as Snow Surfer
Ann McIntire as Skier
Kathy Pelowski as Waitress
Bob Salerno as Skier
Jan Schwartz as Skier
Matt Schweitzer as Wind Surfer
Tom Sims as Snow Surfer
Mike Waltze as Wind Surfer
Jennifer Wilson as Ribbon Dancer

Production
While the movie has a plot, it is essentially irrelevant. The movie contains mainly freestyle skiing scenes with Willy Bogner as director and cameraman. John Denver does the voiceover narration for the English-language version, Emil Steinberger for the German version. Besides skiing scenes, the movie contains snowboarding, hanggliding and windsurfing scenes with sports talents Gianfranco L'Amore, Jan Bucher and Mike Waltze. Marietta Waters performed the title track Fire and Ice. With Fire and Ice, Bogner won the Bavarian Film Awards (Special Prize) in 1986, and a Bambi in 1985. Bogner directed a kind of sequel in 1990, named Fire, Ice and Dynamite.

External links

1986 films
1980s sports films
German sports films
West German films
English-language German films
Films set in the United States
Skiing films
Films scored by Harold Faltermeyer
1980s German films